Plau may refer to:
Urokinase
Plau am See, Germany
Plau am See (Amt)
Pław, Poland
Henrik Plau (born 1988), Norwegian actor

See also
Plaus